Daphnella intercedens is a species of sea snail, a marine gastropod mollusk in the family Raphitomidae.

Description
The length of the shell is 5 mm, its diameter 2 mm.

(Original description) The small, delicate, thin shell has a fusiform shape. it is white with a partial pale yellow suffusion. It contains 7 whorls, of which three are in the protoconch. These are globose, semidiaphanous, white, shining, the third being microscopically longitudinally striate. The subsequent whorls, all impressed suturally, are closely longitudinally ribbed. These ribs are close, shining, and smooth, obliquely flexuose, with the interstices finely spirally striate. The aperture is ovate-oblong. The outer lip is thin, but hardly adult. The columellar margin is oblique. The siphonal canal is abbreviate.

Distribution
This marine species occurs off Cuba.

References

External links

intercedens
Gastropods described in 1923